Provanna macleani is a species of sea snail, a marine gastropod mollusk in the family Provannidae.

Description

Distribution
This species occurs near East Pacific hydrothermal vents

References

External links
 Warén A. & Bouchet P. (2001). Gastropoda and Monoplacophora from hydrothermal vents and seeps new taxa and records. The Veliger 44(2): 116–231

macleani
Gastropods described in 1989